Senator Renato "Compañero" Cayetano Memorial Science and Technology High School (SRCCMSTHS or Cayetano Science and rarely, Cayetano SciTech) is a special public secondary school in Taguig City that has a special science and technology curriculum.

Senator Renato "Compañero" Cayetano Memorial Science and Technology High School is located at 31st cor 51st Sts. Pamayanang Diego Silang, Ususan, Taguig City, Philippines.

History 

Then-Congressman Alan Peter Cayetano introduced House Bill No. 4448 on February 21, 2002. It is an act establishing a Science and Technology High School in Pamayanang Diego Silang in Taguig City to be known as the Taguig-Pateros Science and Technology High School and the funds were appropriated for its establishment.

On September 4, 2002, a Memorandum of Agreement (MOA) was signed between Congressman Cayetano, Rufo B. Colayco of Bases Conversion Development Authority, and Jovita O. Calixihan of DepEd-Division of Taguig-Pateros for the allocation of five thousand square meter area of the community facilities at the heart of Pamayanang Diego Silang in Taguig.

The site was immediately equipped with a perimeter fence through the efforts of the late Sen. Renato "Compañero" Cayetano. Immediately, a four-story, twelve classroom building was built and the school was ready for occupancy. In early 2003, another four-story twelve classroom building was built in preparation for its opening.

The Division Office of DepEd Taguig-Pateros played its part in this endeavor by preparing and complying with all the requirements under DepEd Order No. 71 s.2003 through Mr. George P. Tizon, the Administrative Officer of the Division. On September 21, 2004, the approval for the establishment of SRCCMTHS was granted by the DepEd-National Capital Region after having complied and met the standard of a science & technology school.

On December 14, 2004, Dr. Rolando L. Magno, Schools Division Superintendent of Taguig & Pateros announced the administration of the entrance examination for admission among graduating students of public schools. More than three hundred students took the exam of which only 146 passed.

At the end of the school year 2004-2005, a bill was introduced by Congressman Edmund Reyes, the Chairman of Committee on Education in the House of Representatives renaming Taguig-Pateros Science & Technology High School to be Senator Renato "Compañero" Cayetano Memorial Science and Technology High School (SRCCMSTHS).

On June 6, 2005, the school began its operation under the leadership of its OIC/Principal, Dr. George Tizon, the concurrent Administrative Officer V of DepEd-Taguig City & Pateros.

References

External links
 SRCCMSTHS' Official Website

Schools in Taguig
Science high schools in Metro Manila
Public schools in Metro Manila